Sedgley is a surname. Notable people with the surname include:

John Sedgley (1939–2020), English cricketer
Max Sedgley, British record producer, drummer, and DJ
Steve Sedgley (born 1968), English footballer and manager